Lars Anthonius Johannes Boom (born 30 December 1985) is a professional cyclo-cross and mountain bike racing cyclist from the Netherlands. He has also competed professionally in road racing, between 2004 and 2019.

Boom won the cyclo-cross world championships in 2008. He has also been the Dutch national cyclo-cross champion in his discipline from 2001 to 2012 – junior cyclo-cross champion from 2002 to 2003, under-23 champion from 2004 to 2006, and the elite champion from 2007 to 2012.

Career

Rabobank Continental (2003–2008)
During the 2005–2006 cyclocross season, Boom who just turned 20 years of age, scored several wins including a win ahead of Sven Nys in the Grand Prix Sven Nys as well as the win in the Vlaamse Druivenveldrit Overijse after Bart Wellens was disqualified for having kicked a spectator. Boom was beaten by Zdeněk Štybar in a sprint for the Under 23 World Championships but returned a year later to dominate the race and to win the Under 23 World Champion jersey.

For the 2006–2007 season, Boom asked and received special dispensation to ride the Dutch Elite Cyclo Cross championships and became Champion of the Netherlands. In addition to Boom's successes in cyclo-cross, he has achieved success on the road and has won several stage races such as the Tour de Bretagne. In September 2007, Boom became Under 23 World Time Trial champion beating Russian Mikhail Ignatiev. In November 2007, Boom won the Gerrit Schulte Trophy as the Dutch cyclist of the year for his two World Championship wins. In the 2007–2008 Cyclo-cross season, Boom won a World Cup event in Pijnacker, a Gazet van Antwerpen event in Loenhout and then became Dutch Elite National cyclo-cross champion for the second time. After that, he also won the World Cup races in Liévin and Hoogerheide. He went into the world championships in Treviso 2008 as big favourite and did not fail, he won the race and became the second rider after Radomír Šimůnek to win the world title in all categories (Junior, Espoir and Elite).

During the 2008 road season, Boom continued his progression on the road despite a successful cyclocross season. On his third day of racing on the road, he won the third stage of the Tour de Bretagne in Fréhel. Boom also won the sixth stage time trial. Boom then dominated the oldest stage race in the Netherlands – the Olympia's Tour. After competing in two stage races in Spain in which he won the first and won three stages in the second, Boom returned to the Netherlands where he won the Dutch national road race championships for elite riders. He would win the national time trial title several weeks later after which he announced that he intended on switching focus from cyclo-cross to road racing after the 2008/09 cyclo-cross season.

Rabobank (2009–2014)
In 2009 Boom won the Tour of Belgium after a strong performance uphill, and in the final Time Trial. In his first Vuelta a España, he was part of a break of 12 riders in the 15th stage. He rode away on the final climb and took the stage, making him the first Dutchman to win a stage in a Grand Tour since 2005.

Boom started the 2010 season by winning the Dutch national cyclocross championships. This was only his second and last cross of the season he rode. In the prologue of Paris–Nice he bested time-trial giants Jens Voigt, Levi Leipheimer, Alberto Contador and David Millar. During the winter of 2010–2011 Boom made a short return to cyclocross, he won the World Cup race in Zolder and won for the fifth consecutive time the Dutch national cyclocross championships. In 2011 he was again the fastest in a prologue of a World Tour event: the Critérium du Dauphiné. Later that year he won two stages and the general classification in the Tour of Britain.

Boom won the Dutch Cyclocross Championship for the sixth consecutive time in January 2012, extending his consecutive streak record.

In 2014 Boom won the fifth stage of the Tour de France, a stage marked by difficulty due to wet conditions and significant sections of cobblestones. The stage was his first win of 2014 and came nine years to the day after the previous victory by a Dutch rider (Pieter Weening) in the Tour de France.

Astana (2015–2016)
Subsequently, Boom announced that he would be leaving Belkin and joining  for the 2015 and 2016 seasons.

Coming into the Tour de France, Boom's notable results of the 2015 campaign were fourth in Paris–Roubaix and sixth in the Tour of Flanders. There was some controversy at the beginning of the Tour, as Boom's cortisol levels were too low in his blood per MPCC rules to participate in a cycling event, but the Astana management decided to field him anyway. Boom blamed his asthma inhaler for his low cortisol levels.

LottoNL–Jumbo (2017–2018)
After two seasons with Astana, Boom announced in August 2016 he would be joining .

In January 2018 Boom had a successful heart surgery to treat a cardiac arrhythmia. Boom returned to racing for the Paris–Nice in March.

In May 2018, Boom was expelled from the Tour of Norway for aggression against Belgian rider Preben Van Hecke. Video images showed some kind of incident where Van Hecke had to brake and Boom was upset about this. He overtook Van Hecke and punched him and attacked his helmet during the race. On 2 July, the UCI suspended him for a month, missing the Tour de France as a result.

Retirement from road racing
In December 2019, Boom announced that he was retiring from road racing after being unable to find a contract for 2020, due to his  team folding at the end of the season.

Major results

Cyclo-cross

2001–2002
 1st  National Junior Championships
2002–2003
 1st  UCI World Junior Championships
 1st  National Junior Championships
 1st Overall Junior Superprestige
1st Sint-Michielsgestel
1st Gavere
1st Gieten
1st Diegem
1st Hoogstraten
1st Harnes
3rd Vorselaar
2003–2004
 1st  National Under-23 Championships
 UCI Under-23 World Cup
1st Koksijde
3rd Nommay
2004–2005
 1st  UEC European Under-23 Championships
 1st  National Under-23 Championships
 3rd Overall Under-23 Superprestige
1st Ruddervoorde
2nd Hamme
3rd Gieten
2005–2006
 1st  National Under-23 Championships
 1st Overijse
 Gazet van Antwerpen
1st GP Sven Nys
 UCI Under-23 World Cup
1st Hoogerheide
 2nd  UCI World Under-23 Championships
 Superprestige
3rd Gieten
2006–2007
 1st  UCI World Under-23 Championships
 1st  National Championships
 UCI Under-23 World Cup
1st Hoogerheide
2nd Nommay
 1st Heerlen
 Gazet van Antwerpen
2nd GP Sven Nys
 3rd Eeklo
2007–2008
 1st  UCI World Championships
 1st  National Championships
 UCI World Cup
1st Pijnacker
1st Liévin
1st Hoogerheide
3rd Tábor
3rd Koksijde
3rd Hofstade
 Gazet van Antwerpen
1st Azencross
2nd Niel
2nd GP Rouwmoer
3rd Sluitingsprijs
 1st Mechelen
 1st Zeddam
 2nd Heerlen
 Superprestige
3rd Gieten
2008–2009
 1st  National Championships
 Gazet van Antwerpen
1st Niel
2nd Koppenbergcross
 UCI World Cup
1st Pijnacker
1st Nommay
2nd Milan
 1st Surhuisterveen
 Superprestige
2nd Veghel-Eerde
 2nd Overijse
 2nd Woerden
2009–2010
 1st  National Championships
2010–2011
 1st  National Championships
 UCI World Cup
1st Heusden-Zolder
 1st Leudelange
2011–2012
 1st  National Championships
2012–2013
 2nd National Championships
2016–2017
 2nd Surhuisterveen

UCI World Cup results

Road

2004
 1st Stage 2 Triptyque Ardennais
 3rd Overall Circuit de Lorraine
2005
 1st  Young rider classification, Triptyque des Barrages
 1st Stage 2 Grand Prix de la Somme
 2nd Overall Hessen-Rundfahrt
 10th Grand Prix de la ville de Pérenchies
2006
 1st  Overall Volta ao Distrito de Santarém
1st Stage 3 (ITT)
 1st  Overall Le Triptyque des Monts et Châteaux
1st Stage 2 (ITT)
 1st Stage 3a (ITT) Thüringen Rundfahrt der U23
 2nd Time trial, National Under-23 Championships
2007
 1st  Time trial, UCI World Under-23 Championships
 1st  Time trial, National Under-23 Championships
 1st  Overall Tour de Bretagne
1st  Young rider classification
1st Prologue & Stage 5 (ITT)
 1st Omloop der Kempen
 1st Prologue Tour de Normandie
 3rd Overall Volta ao Distrito de Santarém
 3rd Overall Tour du Poitou-Charentes
 4th Overall Olympia's Tour
1st Prologue, Stages 4 & 6 (ITT)
 6th Grand Prix de la Somme
2008
 National Championships
1st  Road race
1st  Time trial
 1st  Overall Olympia's Tour
1st Stages 7 (ITT) & 8
 1st  Overall Volta a Lleida
1st Stage 8
 Circuito Montañés
1st Stages 1, 5a (ITT) & 7
 Tour de Bretagne
1st Stages 3 & 6 (ITT)
 1st Stage 4 Vuelta Ciclista a León
2009
 1st  Overall Tour of Belgium
 1st Stage 15 Vuelta a España
 7th Overall Sachsen Tour
2010
 1st Grote Prijs Jef Scherens
 1st Prologue Paris–Nice
 3rd Road race, National Championships
 5th E3 Prijs Vlaanderen
 6th Overall Eneco Tour
2011
 1st  Overall Tour of Britain
1st Stages 3 & 6
 1st Prologue Critérium du Dauphiné
 1st Prologue Tour of Qatar
 1st Stage 1 (TTT) Tirreno–Adriatico
 9th Gent–Wevelgem
 10th Omloop Het Nieuwsblad
2012
 1st  Overall Eneco Tour
 National Championships
2nd Road race
2nd Time trial
 2nd Overall Ster ZLM Toer
1st Stage 3
 2nd Ronde van Zeeland Seaports
 5th Road race, UCI World Championships
 6th Paris–Roubaix
2013
 1st  Overall Ster ZLM Toer
1st Stage 4
 1st Profronde van Heerlen
 1st Profronde van Zevenbergen
 1st  Points classification, Eneco Tour
 1st Stage 2 (ITT) Tour Méditerranéen
 2nd Overall Tour du Haut Var
1st Stage 2
 3rd Profronde van Oostvoorne
 4th Binche–Chimay–Binche
2014
 1st Stage 5 Tour de France
 2nd Overall Eneco Tour
2015
 1st Stage 1 Danmark Rundt
 4th Paris–Roubaix
 6th Tour of Flanders
2016
 6th E3 Harelbeke
2017
 1st  Overall Tour of Britain
1st Stage 5 (ITT)
 4th Veenendaal–Veenendaal Classic
 8th Overall BinckBank Tour
1st Stage 5
2019
 4th Le Samyn
 8th Clásica de Almería

Grand Tour general classification results timeline

Monuments results timeline

Mountain Bike
2017
 1st  Marathon, National Championships
2018
 1st  Beach race, UEC European Championships
 1st  Marathon, National Championships
2019
 2nd Marathon, National Championships

See also
 List of Dutch Olympic cyclists

References

External links

 
 
 

1985 births
Living people
Cyclo-cross cyclists
Dutch male cyclists
Dutch Vuelta a España stage winners
People from Heusden
Cyclists at the 2012 Summer Olympics
Olympic cyclists of the Netherlands
2014 Tour de France stage winners
Dutch Tour de France stage winners
UCI Cyclo-cross World Champions (men)
Dutch cycling time trial champions
UCI Road World Championships cyclists for the Netherlands
Cyclists from North Brabant